Alexander M. Johnson (born May 15, 1990) is a former competitive American figure skater. He is the 2017 CS Nebelhorn Trophy silver medalist, 2013 International Challenge Cup silver medalist, and 2008 JGP Czech Republic champion.

Personal life 
Alexander Johnson was born on May 15, 1990, in Minneapolis, Minnesota. His elder sister, Shannon, is a skating coach.

Johnson graduated from Hopkins High School in 2008. After briefly studying science and engineering at the University of Minnesota, he took a leave of absence. He later studied at Normandale Community College before enrolling at the University of Minnesota's Carlson School of Management. In August 2018, he completed an investment banking internship at Lazard.

Career

Early years 
Johnson began learning to skate in 1999. His first coach was Joan Orvis. Beginning in the 2001–2002 season, he competed in juvenile men's singles for two seasons, in the intermediate ranks for two seasons, and then as a novice for two seasons; he won the novice men's silver medal at the 2007 U.S. Championships.

Johnson debuted on the ISU Junior Grand Prix (JGP) series in autumn 2007. The following season, he won two JGP medals — gold in the Czech Republic and bronze in England — and qualified for the ISU Junior Grand Prix Final, where he finished sixth. He received the junior bronze medal at the 2009 U.S. Championships.

Johnson also trained in pair skating. He competed with Chelsey Jernberg in the juvenile category at the 2004 and 2005 U.S. Junior Championships. With Danielle Viola, he placed 6th in the novice ranks at the 2012 U.S. Championships.

Senior career 
Johnson began competing in the senior men's category in the 2009–2010 season. He made his senior international debut at the 2009 Finlandia Trophy.

At the 2013 U.S. Championships, Johnson finished seventh after placing 12th in the short program and fifth in the free skate. He landed a 3Lz-1Lo-3F in the free skate. He then won silver at the 2013 International Challenge Cup in The Hague, Netherlands. He was coached mainly by Tom Dickson and Catarina Lindgren, and also worked once a week with Christy Krall.

In June 2013, Johnson tore ligaments in his right ankle while practicing a triple Axel jump and sustained nerve damage from the knee down during surgery in July. He returned to the ice after ten weeks and resumed full training in April 2014 with a titanium screw in his ankle.

Johnson finished 11th at the 2015 U.S. Championships. In the summer of 2015, he underwent surgery for multiple hernias. At the 2016 U.S. Championships, he ranked seventh in the short program, fifth in the free skate, and sixth overall – his best result to date. He replicated that result at the 2017 U.S. Championships, after placing ninth in the short and fifth in the free.

In 2018, Johnson was invited to his first Grand Prix event, the 2018 NHK Trophy.

In 2019, Johnson decided to start a career in finance and work as a part time skating coach, effectively ending participation in competitive skating.

Programs

Competitive highlights 
GP: Grand Prix; CS: Challenger Series; JGP: Junior Grand Prix

Men's singles: Senior career

Men's singles: Juvenile through junior career

Pairs with Jernberg and Viola

Detailed results 
Small medals for short and free programs awarded only at ISU Championships.

Junior level

References

External links 
 
 

American male single skaters
Living people
1990 births
Sportspeople from Minneapolis
Hopkins High School alumni